Zenophleps lignicolorata is a species of geometrid moth in the family Geometridae. It is found in North America.

The MONA or Hodges number for Zenophleps lignicolorata is 7406.

References

Further reading

External links

 

Xanthorhoini
Articles created by Qbugbot
Moths described in 1874